Julia Berezikova (born ) is a Russian female mixed martial artist and boxer. In February, 2014 she was the #7-ranked 125-pound female fighter in the world according to the Unified Women's MMA Rankings. She has not fought since she knocked out Rosy Duarte in October 2015. She is a W5 World Champion and is also a champion in Judo, Boxing, Wushu, Sambo and Muay Thai.

Background

During her childhood, Berezikova injured her back after an unsuccessful flip and her doctors thought that she would not be able to practice sport any longer, but she was able to make a complete recovery.

Berezikova arrived in Saint Petersburg in 1999, and in 2001 she first learned about MMA.

Berezikova's brother was an acquaintance of Roman Zentsov, who recommended that Berezikova begin training in boxing to combine it with her knowledge of judo.

Berezikova became a medalist in Wushu Sanda in 2003. From 2003 to 2005, she was the champion of Saint Petersburg in boxing, the winner of Russia's Boxing Cup in 2003, winner of the Russian boxing championship in 2004 and 2005, Saint Petersburg combat sambo champion in 2004 and Russia Jiu-jitsu champion in 2008.

While in Saint Petersburg, Berezikova met Vladislav Lavrinovich, who was putting together MMA events. Berezikova asked him to give her a chance, and although he refused at first, he eventually decided to allow her to compete.

Mixed martial arts career

On  at bodogFight: Clash of the Nations, Berezikova was defeated by American Julie Kedzie in the second via TKO (referee stoppage) after Kedzie trapped Berezikova with a leg triangle from which Kedzie punched Berezikova freely, preventing her from escaping or defending.

Debuting with MMA promotion FightForce, Berezikova faced the experienced Japanese judoka and former Smackgirl open weight champion Megumi Yabushita.

On , Berezikova defeated Karla Benitez by split decision at Far Eastern Federation of Modern Pankration: Mayor Cup 2012.

She defeated Benitez by submission due to an armbar in round two.

Boxing
She has also participated in other exhibition matches in Japan.

Kickboxing

Outside sports

Berezikova has worked as consultant of fight scenes for some Russian productions. She was a participant of Russia Channel One's show Big Races.

Along with fellow MMA fighter Aleksander Emelianenko and other Russian athletes, Berezikova participated in the 2010 Russian TV series starring Yevgeni Sidikhin, Olympic Village.

Mixed martial arts record

|-
| Win
|align=center|9-4
| Rosy Duarte
| TKO (punches and knees)
| EFN: Fight Nights Petersburg
| 
|align=center| 2
|align=center| 1:08
| Saint Petersburg, Russia
|
|-
| Win
|align=center|8–4
| Juliana Werner
| Submission (leg lock)
| XFC International 9
| 
|align=center|2
|align=center|1:35
| Sao Paulo, Brazil
| 
|-
| Loss
|align=center|7–4
| Joanna Jędrzejczyk
| Decision (unanimous)
| Fight Nights: Battle of Moscow 12
| 
|align=center|2
|align=center|5:00
| Moscow, Russia
| 
|-
| Win
|align=center|7–3
| Karla Benitez
| Submission (armbar)
| Super Fight League 12
| 
|align=center|2
|align=center|1:42
| Mumbai, India
| 
|-
| Win
|align=center|6–3
| Karla Benitez
| Decision (split)
| FEFoMP: Mayor Cup 2012
| 
|align=center|2
|align=center|5:00
| Khabarovsk, Russia
| 
|-
| Win
|align=center|5–3
| Alena Hola
| Submission (armbar)
| Fight Nights: Battle of Moscow 6
| 
|align=center|2
|align=center|1:35
| Moscow, Russia
| 
|-
| Win
|align=center|4–3
| Eugenia Kostina
| Decision (unanimous)
| Fight Nights: Battle of Moscow 5
| 
|align=center|2
|align=center|3:00
| Moscow, Russia
| 
|-
| Win
|align=center|3-3
| Milana Dudieva
| Submission (punches)
| FightForce: Day of Anger
| 
|align=center|1
|align=center|4:40
| Saint Petersburg, Russia
| 
|-
| Win
|align=center|2–3
| Megumi Yabushita
| Decision (unanimous)
| FightForce: Russia vs. The World
| 
|align=center|3
|align=center|5:00
| Saint Petersburg, Russia
| 
|-
| Loss
|align=center|1–3
| Rosi Sexton
| Submission (armbar)
| bodogFight: Vancouver
| 
|align=center|2
|align=center|1:49
| Vancouver, Canada
| 
|-
| Loss
|align=center|1–2
| Julie Kedzie
| TKO (punches)
| bodogFight: Clash of the Nations
| 
|align=center|2
|align=center|2:49
| Saint Petersburg, Russia
| 
|-
| Win
|align=center|1–1
| Song Lee Jin
| TKO (punches)
| M-1 MFC: Russia vs. Korea
| 
|align=center|1
|align=center|0:51
| South Korea
| 
|-
| Loss
|align=center|0–1
| Tara LaRosa
| Submission (armbar)
| bodogFight: USA vs. Russia
| 
|align=center|2
|align=center|1:28
| Vancouver, Canada
|

Professional boxing record

Championships and accomplishments

Sanshou
Medalist of Russia in Wushu Sanda 2003.

Boxing
Saint Petersburg champion 2003-2005.
Russian Cup winner in 2003.
Russia boxing championship winner 2004, 2005.

Sambo
Saint Petersburg Combat Sambo Champion in 2004.

See also
List of female mixed martial artists
List of female boxers

References

External links
Official website (old) 

Official blog 
Julia Berezikova at Awakening Fighters

1983 births
Russian female mixed martial artists
Russian women boxers
Russian Muay Thai practitioners
Female Muay Thai practitioners
Russian female judoka
Russian jujutsuka
Russian sambo practitioners
Russian sanshou practitioners
Russian practitioners of Brazilian jiu-jitsu
Living people
Flyweight mixed martial artists
Bantamweight mixed martial artists
Mixed martial artists utilizing sambo
Mixed martial artists utilizing sanshou
Mixed martial artists utilizing boxing
Mixed martial artists utilizing Muay Thai
Mixed martial artists utilizing judo
Mixed martial artists utilizing Brazilian jiu-jitsu